Norfolk County Council in England is elected every four years. Since the last boundary changes, 84 councillors have been elected from 84 wards.

Political control
Since the council was formed in 1889, political control has been as follows:

Leadership
The leaders of the council since 2007 have been:

Historical composition

Council election results
 1973 Norfolk County Council election
 1977 Norfolk County Council election
 1981 Norfolk County Council election
 1985 Norfolk County Council election
 1989 Norfolk County Council election
 1993 Norfolk County Council election
 1997 Norfolk County Council election
 2001 Norfolk County Council election
 2005 Norfolk County Council election
 2009 Norfolk County Council election
 2013 Norfolk County Council election
 2017 Norfolk County Council election
2021 Norfolk County Council election

County result maps

By-election results 1997 to present day

1997-2001

2001-2005

2005-2009

2009-2013

Percentage change is since June 2009.

2013-2017

 
Percentage change is since May 2013. The by-election was triggered by the resignation of UKIP Councillor Peter Georgiou, after he admitted to shoplifting and tobacco duty evasion.

 
The by-election was triggered by the resignation of Councillor Matthew Smith, who was elected as a member of the UK Independence Party, following his guilty plea to charges of electoral fraud

 
The by-election was triggered by the resignation of Councillor Stan Hebborn, who was elected for the UK Independence Party.

2017-2021

References

 Norfolk election results
 By-election results

External links
 Norfolk Council

 
Council elections in Norfolk
County council elections in England